Perry Park was the home field for the Keokuk Westerns of the National Association during the 1875 season, so it is considered a major league ballpark by those who count the NA as a major league. The Westerns played their first game against the Chicago White Stockings on May 4, 1875, at Perry Park, which was located in a field beyond Rand Park. They played their last game on June 14, 1875, against the New York Mutuals also at Perry Park.

References 

Baseball venues in Iowa
Defunct baseball venues in the United States
Defunct sports venues in Iowa
Buildings and structures in Keokuk, Iowa